Firat News Agency (ANF) is a Kurdish news agency that gathers and broadcasts news from the Middle East, broadly concerning Kurdish matters. The news agency has offices in Amsterdam and journalists around the world.

It has been variously described as pro-Kurdish, pro-PKK, or PKK-affiliated. CBC and Reuters have described ANF as being "close" to the PKK, and Deutsche Welle states the two entities have "links". The BBC have alternately labelled ANF "pro-Kurdish" and "pro-PKK".

Because of ANF's alleged links with the PKK, access to its websites from Turkey has been repeatedly blocked by Turkish courts, its social media accounts active in the country have been closed, and its journalists have been detained in Turkey.  In addition, Twitter has blocked ANF at the request of the Turkish government.

Arrest of Maxime Azadi 

On 15 December 2016, French-Turkish ANF journalist Maxime Azadi was arrested in Belgium after Turkey issued an Interpol Red Notice for his arrest. The ANF appealed for his immediate release.

The arrest was condemned by press freedom groups, who said the incident highlighted Turkey's crackdown on press freedoms following the 2016 coup attempt. The UK-based NGO Fair Trials described his arrest as Turkish misuse of Interpol's Red Notice system, and the Council of Europe's Platform for the Protection of Journalism and Safety of Journalists released a media freedom alert pertaining to the arrest.

The European Federation of Journalists released a statement, stating "We are very concerned about this arrest which constitutes a dangerous precedent. More than 120 journalists are behind bars in Turkey, where the authorities do not hesitate to abuse anti-terrorist laws to suppress the opposition press. Belgium and other European states should not be complicit in the massive purges ordered by the Turkish government. Dozens of Turkish and Kurdish journalists exiled in Europe would be in a situation of dramatic insecurity".

On 23 December, Azadi was released on bail, leading the Council of Europe to mark the case resolved, concluding it "was no longer an active threat to media freedom".

References

External links
  

2005 establishments in the Netherlands
Companies based in Amsterdam
Kurdish-language mass media
News agencies based in the Netherlands
Organizations established in 2005
Kurdish-language websites
Persian-language websites